The Azerbaijan Higher Military Academy named after Heydar Aliyev is an educational institution of the Azerbaijani Armed Forces. In order to be admitted into the academy, candidates have to be between the ages of 17 and 19 and have completed secondary school education.

Background 

The predecessor institution to the current academy was the Baku Higher Combined Arms Command School (BVOKU), which was founded on 29 November 1939 as one of many military academies of the Soviet Army. By 1951, the developing school was ranked 6th place among the best infantry schools in the USSR. The school was disbanded in 1991 as a result of the fall of the Soviet Union. Among the notable alumni of the BVOKU are former Defense Minister of Armenia Seyran Ohanyan, Minister of Defense of Azerbaijan Zakir Hasanov and Armenian military leader during the Karabakh War Arkady Ter-Tadevosyan.

Development 

The BVOKU was replaced the following year by the Baku High Joint Commanders School, which was created to meet the Azerbaijani military's needs. Some of the first graduates of the school took part in the First Nagorno-Karabakh War until it ended in the summer of 1994. Since 1997, the admission and teaching standards have been implemented in accordance with contemporary education standards. President Heydar Aliyev on 20 August 2001 renamed the school to its current name. His son, President Ilham Aliyev added the honorary name of Heydar Aliyev to the school's full name in March 2004, following his father's death just 3 months before. By presidential decree of 24 December 2015, the Azerbaijan Higher Naval Academy and the Azerbaijan High Military Aviation School were abolished and transferred to the Azerbaijan Higher Military Academy with the establishment of the corresponding faculties there.

Present day 
Graduates of the school are awarded a Bachelor's degree the rank of leytenant upon their commission into the armed forces.

Student life 
In August 2019, the academy military band, led by Colonel Ekhtibar Aliyev, took part in the Spasskaya Tower Military Music Festival and Tattoo, representing Azerbaijan for the first time. In 2020, it was among the units that took part in the Baku Victory Parade in honor of the victory in the Second Nagorno-Karabakh War.

Alumni 
 Shukur Hamidov, National Hero of Azerbaijan
Samid Imanov, member of the Special Forces of Azerbaijan
 Ilgar Mirzayev, colonel of artillery serving in the 3rd Army Corps until his death during the July 2020 Armenian–Azerbaijani clashes.
 Anar Novruzov, the "Father of AGS-17", who was killed in the 2016 Nagorno-Karabakh conflict.
 Hasan Hasanov, resident of the Kalbajar District killed in July 2014.

Rectors of the School 
 Major Ivan Kovalev (1992–2002)
 Lieutenant General Heydar Piriyev (2002–2009)
 Colonel Mirzali Yusifov (5 November 2013–?)
Major General Fuzuli Salahov (?–Present)

References 

Educational institutions established in 1992
Military academies of Azerbaijan
1992 establishments in Azerbaijan